Open Air Suit is an album by the improvisational collective Air featuring Henry Threadgill, Steve McCall, and Fred Hopkins recorded in New York in 1978 featuring four of Threadgill's compositions. It has not been reissued as an individual CD, but it was included in the 8-CD Complete Novus and Columbia Recordings of Henry Threadgill and Air issued by Mosaic Records.

Reception
The Allmusic review by Scott Yanow states: "The music played by this talented trio is complex yet ultimately logical. The talented musicians seem to communicate instantly with each other and they consistently develop their music in the same direction on this stimulating set".

Track listing
All compositions by Henry Threadgill
 "Card Two: The Jick or Mandrill's Cosmic Ass" - 7:25
 "Card Five: Open Air Suit" - 10:22
 "Card Four: Strait White Royal Flush...78" - 6:15
 "Card One: Cutten {2 Knuckles + 2 Widows + 2 Tricks}/3 X1" - 15:30
Recorded at C.I. Recording Studios, New York City on February 21 & 22, 1978

Personnel
Henry Threadgill - alto saxophone, tenor saxophone, baritone saxophone, flute
Fred Hopkins - bass, maracas
Steve McCall - drums, percussion

References

1978 albums
Air (free jazz trio) albums
Albums produced by Michael Cuscuna
Novus Records albums